The six-hour clock, also called the Roman or the Italian system, is a system of date and time notation in Italy which was invented before the modern 24-hour clock. In this system, the day starts at the evening Ave Maria at the end of twilight, approximately half an hour after sunset, and the following 24 hours are divided into four cycles of six hours each.

Historically, several other ancient timekeeping systems are known to have begun the day at twilight. In this case the practice in Italy dates to the Middle Ages, in the Papal States whence it spread to other parts of central Italy. It originates from the monastic tradition of dividing the day according to prayer times. While common from the 1400s to the 1600s, it was replaced by the 12-hour clock first in the north, and in the south around the early 1800s.

Many historic buildings in Italy feature old clock faces divided into six hours, which make four revolutions per day.

A clock which counted only six hours had the advantage of being much simpler mechanically.

See also
The Thai six-hour clock, another six-hour system.

References

Further reading

. 
. 

Date and time representation
Italian culture
Time measurement systems